Get Back is a British sitcom written by Laurence Marks and Maurice Gran which ran for two series between 26 October 1992 and 15 November 1993 on BBC1. It followed the Sweet family, led by father Martin, played by Ray Winstone, a self-made man who lost his money in the recession of the early 1990s and has to downsize, moving in with his father in a council flat. It is notable for the early appearance of Kate Winslet, who played one of the family's daughters.

The series title, the character names and the titles of each episode were all inspired by Beatles songs.

Characters 
 Ray Winstone as Martin Sweet
 Carol Harrison as Loretta Sweet
 Kate Winslet as Eleanor Sweet
 Michelle Cattini as Joanne 'Jojo' Sweet
 Larry Lamb as Albert Sweet
 Jane Booker as Prudence Sweet
 John Bardon as Bernie Sweet
 George 'Zoot' Money as Bungalow Bill
 Shirley Stelfox as Lucy (Series 1)

List of episodes

Series 1 (1992)

Series 2 (1993)

References

External links
 
 

1992 British television series debuts
1993 British television series endings
1990s British sitcoms
BBC television sitcoms
English-language television shows
Television series by Fremantle (company)
Television shows set in London